A. nivea may refer to:
 Acentria nivea, a synonym for Acentria ephemerella, the watermilfoil moth or water veneer, a moth species
 Argyrochosma nivea, an Andean fern species
 Aria nivea, a synonym for Sorbus aria, the whitebeam or common whitebeam, a tree species
 Asclepias nivea, the Caribbean milkweed, a plant species

See also 
 Nivea (disambiguation)